Irán Eory (21 October 1939 – 10 March 2002, born Elvira Teresa Eory) was an Iranian-born actress. She achieved fame in Mexico after moving to that country in the late 1960s.

Biography 

She was born in Tehran, Iran, to an Austrian father and an Iranian Jewish mother — Angela Sidi — on October 21, 1939 in Tehran, Iran. Irán was given as the screen name for her, because it suggests her birth country.

Eory was raised in Spain, where she learned Spanish, and entered a beauty contest in Monaco, distinguished by Prince Rainier. She started her acting career before emigrating to Mexico in the late 1960s, to become an actress, singer, and a theatre producer.

Eory suffered a brain hemorrhage and she died at 62 in Mexico City on March 10, 2002 of embolism. Her ashes were entombed at the cemetery Panteón de Las Lomas located in Naucalpan, State of Mexico.

Filmography

 Aventuras en el tiempo (2001) Telenovela .... Violeta
 Por un beso (2000) Telenovela .... Carmen
 Por tu amor (telenovela) (1999) Telenovela .... Mama Paz
 La Usurpadora (1998) Telenovela .... Lourdes
 Gotita de amor (1998) Telenovela .... Madre Superiora
 Sin ti (1997) Telenovela .... Mercedes
 Esmeralda (telenovela) (1997) Telenovela .... Sor Piedad
 María la del Barrio (1995) Telenovela .... Victoria Montenegro de De la Vega
 El vuelo del águila (1994) Telenovela .... Agustina de Romero Rubio
 Prisionera de amor (1994) Telenovela .... Eloisa
 Entre la vida y la muerte (1993) Telenovela .... Aída
 Carrusel de las Américas (1992) Telenovela .... Doña Marcelina Rochild
 La Pícara Soñadora (1991) Telenovela .... Doña Marcelina Rochild
 En carne propia (1990) Telenovela .... Susana Tamaris
 Cuando llega el amor (1990) Telenovela .... Rosalía
 Principessa (1984) Telenovela .... Paola
 El último kamikaze (1983) Movie
 Rosángela (1983) Telenovela....Rosángela
 Barcelona sur (1981) Movie
 Domenica Montero (1978) Telenovela .... Domenica Montero
 Mundo de juguete (1974) Telenovela .... Tía Mercedes Balboa
 El Hijo de Angela María (1974) Movie
 En busca de un muro (1973) Movie
 El amor tiene cara de mujer (1973) Movie
 La justicia tiene doce años (1973) Movie
 Las tres perfectas casadas (1972) Movie
 Entre dos amores (1972) Movie
 El amor tiene cara de mujer (1971) Telenovela .... Vicky Gallardo y Pimentel
 Las máscaras (1971) Telenovela
 El cielo y tú (1971) Movie
 Muchacho (featuring Sandro) (1970) Movie
 Encrucijada (1970) Telenovela....Susan Harrison
 Rubí (1969) Movie .... Rubí
 ¡Se armó el belén! (1969) Movie
 Flash 18 (1968) Movie .... Herself
 No desearás la mujer de tu prójimo (1968) Movie
 Novios 68 (1967) Movie .... Teresa, farmacéutica
 Los chicos con las chicas (1967) Movie
 ¿Qué hacemos con los hijos? (1967) Movie
 Una chica para dos (1966) Movie
 Tre notti violente aka Web of Violence (1966) Movie
 Las viudas, aka El aniversario (1966) Movie
 El arte de no casarse (1966) Movie .... Sueca
 Misión Lisboa (Espionage in Lisbon) (1965) Movie
 Aragonese Nobility (1965) Movie
 Man of the Cursed Valley (1964) Movie
 El pecador y la bruja, aka The Sinner and the Witch (1964) Movie
 Confidencias de un marido aka Tercero Izquierda (1963) Movie
 Horror aka The Blancheville Monster (1963) Movie
 Los muertos no perdonan (1963) Movie
 La máscara de Scaramouche, aka The Adventures of Scaramouche (1963) Movie
 The Fair of the Dove (1963) Movie
 Ensayo general para la muerte (1963) Movie
 Esa pícara pelirroja (1963) Movie
 Rogelia (1962) Movie
 Vuelve San Valentín (1962) Movie
 Sabían demasiado (1962) Movie
 Accidente 703 (1962) Movie
 Fray Escoba (1961) Movie
 Prohibido enamorarse (1961) Movie .... Enfermera del doctor Bolt
 Kubala (1955) Movie
 Tres huchas para Oriente (1954) Movie
 The Devil Plays the Flute (1953) Movie

References

External links 
 

1939 births
2002 deaths
Mexican telenovela actresses
Mexican television actresses
Mexican film actresses
Jewish actresses
Actresses from Tehran
Iranian emigrants to Spain
Iranian emigrants to Mexico
20th-century Mexican actresses
21st-century Mexican actresses
Iranian people of Austrian descent
People of Iranian-Jewish descent
Deaths from embolism